Pyrah is a surname. Notable persons with that name include:

 Ervine Pyrah Mosby (1877–1916), English rugby league player
 Barbara Pyrah (1943–2016), British geologist and museum curator
 Gill Pyrah, British journalist
 Jason Pyrah (born 1969), American runner
 Richard Pyrah (born 1982), British cricketer